Get Disowned is Hop Along's second full-length album. It was released in March 2012 on Hot Green Records in the US and Big Scary Monsters in the UK/Europe. In 2016 it was reissued by Saddle Creek.

Background and recording
Hop Along approached former Algernon Cadwallader guitarist Joe Reinhart to produce the album because vocalist Frances Quinlan preferred to work with a friend rather than a stranger. The band was met with time constraints during recording due to the members being involved with other projects. Consequently, the recording process lasted two years. Because of this, Quinlan described the album as a "collage".

Reception and legacy
"Tibetan Pop Stars", the album's second track, has continued to receive critical acclaim in recent years. In a 2020 list ranking emo's 100 best songs, the staff of Vulture placed the track highly at #10. The site's David Anthony wrote that it "so succinctly summed up everything great about the genre", noting the band's perfectly achieving "a distinct subtlety" evident in other of emo's best bands.

Track listing

Personnel 
Hop Along
 Tyler Long - bass
 Frances Quinlan - vocal, guitar, piano, steel drum, rhodes, banjo, autoharp
 Mark Quinlan - drums, percussion, organ, accordion, piano
 Joe Reinhart - guitar, bass, synthesizer, piano, rhodes, tambourine

Additional musicians
 Chrissy Tashjian - backing vocals (tracks: 1, 2, 3, 5, 9, & 10)
 Dominic Angelella - guitar (tracks: 2, 3, 4, 5, 6, 8, & 9)

Production
 Joe Reinhart - engineering
 Ryan Schwabe - mastering
 Peter Helmis - layout

References 

2012 albums
Saddle Creek Records albums
Hop Along albums